Otites nebulosa is a species of ulidiid or picture-winged fly in the genus Otites of the family Ulidiidae.

References

nebulosa
Insects described in 1804
Diptera of Europe